Defending champion Diede de Groot defeated Yui Kamiji in the final, 6–0, 6–2 to win the women's singles wheelchair tennis title at the 2019 Australian Open. It was her third step towards a non-calendar-year Grand Slam.

Seeds

Draw

Draw

References 

General

 Drawsheet on ausopen.com

Specific

Wheelchair Women's Singles
2019 Women's Singles